The 2010 Atlanta Beat season was the club's inaugural season in Women's Professional Soccer, joining the Philadelphia Independence as expansion teams in the league's second season, and was their first season in the top division of women's soccer in the American soccer pyramid. Including the WUSA franchise, this was the club's fifth year of existence.

Review and events 
The WPS Beat, with few connections to its WUSA predecessor, was announced on June 18, 2009, as an expansion franchise. It began play at the newly built Kennesaw State University Soccer Stadium, a $16.5 million, 8,300-seat facility that had been built in partnership between the university and the Beat. Their owner, Fitz Johnson, was an attorney and former defense contractor. The Beat's first signings were through the 2009 WPS International Draft, selecting Ramona Bachmann, Johanna Rasmussen, and Mami Yamaguchi. The team also selected Tobin Heath with the first-overall pick in the 2010 WPS College Draft; however, she injured her ankle three matches into the season and did not appear for the Beat again.

On June 4, 2010, after the Saint Louis Athletica folded in the middle of the season, the Beat added Lori Chalupny, Hope Solo, Eniola Aluko (who would lead the team in goals scored on the season), and Tina Ellertson. Its absorption of so many players from Athletica led to women's soccer bloggers to refer to nickname the team "Atlantica".

After a 4-10-5 start, including an eight-match winless streak to start the season, the Beat fired head coach Gareth O'Sullivan and assistant coach Robbie Nicholson. James Galanis was hired to take over as coach; under him, the Beat finished 1-3-1. The Beat conceded the league's most goals in the season (40) and were tied with Sky Blue FC for the fewest scored (20).

Match results

Preseason

WPS

Club

Roster

Management and staff 
Front Office

Coaching Staff

Standings

Awards

WPS Player of the Week

See also 
 2010 in American soccer
 Atlanta Beat

References 

2010
American soccer clubs 2010 season
2010 Women's Professional Soccer season
2010 in sports in Georgia (U.S. state)